Vilém Klíma (10 April 1906 – 6 October 1985), originally Wilhelm Kauders, was a Czech electrical engineer and Holocaust survivor who developed a closed-form expression for the distribution factor of a symmetrical three-phase stator winding.

Vilém Klíma (Wilhelm Kauders) died on 6 October 1985 and in an obituary by Frohne it is mentioned that Klíma's equation for the distribution factor of fractional slot windings is not found in textbooks. Another remark in the obituary is that in some references it is stated that it is not possible to find a closed-form expression for the winding factor of fractional slot windings.

An obituary in German was written by Frohne and one in Czech by Čeřovský.

Introduction
Vilém Klíma was born on 10 April 1906 as Wilhelm Kauders. The reason why Klíma changed his name is related to tragic events that occurred during the Second World War. If one takes a closer look at the references listed in the last paper by Klíma, there is an entry entitled Systematik der Drehstromwicklungen and the author is given as V. Klíma (Kauders). To supply a name between brackets is not typical, and the only paper with this title was written by Wilhelm Kauders.

In the first of his two remarkable papers Klíma explains the systematics of stator  windings and the calculation of the winding factors. This work aimed to determine the parameters that characterise the air gap of the winding. Also in this paper the induced voltage in the coil sides is already mentioned and represented as a vector. The resultant vector diagram was called the star of coil groups (German: Spulengruppenstern). The adjacent vectors on such a diagram that belong to the same phase is called a phase belt (German: Zone).

Two years later, in the second paper by Klíma, the algebraic methods developed in the first paper were visualised by means of Tingley's diagram. The latter could be referred to as a linear representation of what became known as the star of slots (German: Nutenstern). The star of slots is constructed using the electrical angle between two adjacent slots. Computer technology as we know it today was not available at the time and the use of graph paper certainly was common. Furthermore, such graphical methods definitely contributed to the subject of stator windings.

In the Theresienstadt ghetto 
Little is known about Klíma. However, his name appears in a list of lecturers in the  ghetto of Terezín. The entry details for Kauders record the following:

Klíma is also mentioned in the book University Over The Abyss: The story behind 520 lecturers and 2,430 lectures in KZ Theresienstadt 1942–1944 by Makarova. A very interesting detail from the book relates how Dr. Goldschmied and Dr. Kauders were secretly taken to Germany to improve the performance of German
radar. A witness, Gerda Haas, remembered the following:
One day, the two were ordered to prepare themselves to leave Terezin. Their suitcases must have been cleaned of any signs and numbers, yellow stars were torn off. They were told that they would be employed for a large industrial concern in Germany. Their dependents stayed in Terezin. Soon, Kauders sent a postcard saying that he was in the [concentration camp] Rosenberg (or -burg), where he was freezing terribly and where he worked on his books all day.

The first book by Klíma entitled Trojfázové komutátorové derivační motory : jejich teorie a praxe was published in 1962. Then in 1975, together with H. Jordan and K.P. Kovács, Vilém Klíma published a book on induction machines entitled Asynchronmaschinen.

A short biography of Vilém Klíma
Vilém Klíma finished his studies with distinction in 1928 at the German technical University in Prague. He then started to work for the company  ČKD (Českomoravská Kolben-Daněk) in Prague. In 1932 Vilém Klíma received his Dr.-Ing. for his dissertation entitled Systematik der Drehstromwicklungen.

After the Munich Agreement in September 1938, Germany annexed the Czech boundary territory, and later (in March 1939) occupied the whole of Bohemia. Then, in November 1941, Vilém Klíma was ordered to leave for the concentration camp at Terezín, which was a holding camp for Jews from central and southern Europe, and was regularly cleared of its overcrowded population by transports to death camps such as  Auschwitz. During April 1945 Vilém Klíma survived the so-called  death march (a miracle at that time). Because of the hated German occupation of Czechoslovakia, Klíma changed his name from Wilhelm Kauders to Vilém Klíma. (At the time Czech families with German names frequently changed their names to Czech-sounding names.)

After the war Klíma started a research centre, Centre for Electric Machines, in Brno where he served as the first director until 1951. In 1958 Klíma was awarded the title of Dr.Scientium technicarum for his thesis entitled Theorie der Selbstserregung von Drehstromnebenschluß-kommutatormotoren mit Kondensatoren im Läuferkreis und ihre Verhütung. Until his retirement in 1973 he was part of the research centre in Běchovice near Prague. Vilém Klíma died on 6 October 1985 in Prague.

Klíma's closed expression

Introductory remarks 
Until now, the literature that refers to Klíma's closed expression is very limited. Authors that refer to the closed expression are Kremser Brune and Germishuizen. Additionally, Kremser and Brune are all related to the university of Hanover where Vilém Klíma regularly held lectures since 1964 as reported by Frohne.

Distribution factor
The distribution factor, as summarised by Brune, for all types of m-phase symmetrical fractional slot windings is
given as

where

is the commutator pitch. The numbers q1 and q2 depend on whether Qb is even or odd and
are calculated as follows:

Notes

External links

References

1906 births
1986 deaths
Czechoslovak engineers
Czech Jews
Theresienstadt Ghetto survivors